Rohm is a Japanese semiconductor manufacturer.

Rohm,  Roehm, (and variants as to casing and/or diacritical marks)  also may refer to:

People bearing such a name  

 Elisabeth Röhm (born 1973), German/American television actress
  

 Maria Rohm (1945–2018), Austrian actress
 Otto Röhm (1876–1939), founder of the American chemical company Rohm and Haas
 Ernst Röhm (1887–1934), purged and murdered German commander and cofounder of the Nazi SA (Stormtroopers)

 Jair-Rôhm Parker Wells (born 1958) American jazz musician

Institutions 
 ROHM (the Royal Opera House Muscat),  operatic venue in Muscat, Oman
 Industrial enterprises:
 RÖHM GmbH, German chucking tool manufacturer
 Röhm (RG), manufacturer of firearms sometimes known as "RG"
 Rohm and Haas, American chemical company

See also 
 ROLM, a former technology company